The 1977 Summer Deaflympics, officially known as the 13th Summer Deaflympics, is an international multi-sport event that was celebrated from July 17 to July 27, 1977, in Bucharest, Romania.

Sports
 Athletics
 Basketball
 Cycling
 Football
 Handball
 Shooting
 Swimming
 Table Tennis
 Tennis
 Volleyball
 Water Polo
 Wrestling

Medal Tally

Notable achievements
Jeff Float won 10 gold medals for swimming in this competition, a record in the Deaflympics.

References

Deaflympics
International sports competitions hosted by Romania
July 1977 sports events in Europe
1977 in Romanian sport
1970s in Bucharest
Sports competitions in Bucharest